Marapanim is a municipality in the state of Pará in the Northern region of Brazil.

The municipality is on the left (west) bank of the Marapanim River.
It contains the  Mestre Lucindo Marine Extractive Reserve, created in 2014.

See also
List of municipalities in Pará

References

Municipalities in Pará
Populated coastal places in Pará